Sergio Cotta (6 October 1920 – 3 May 2007) was an Italian philosopher, jurist and university professor. He was considered a specialist on the political thought of the Enlightenment. Cotta, along with André Masson and Robert Shackleton, was considered the most important interpreter of Montesquieu during the 20th century.

Cotta was educated in Florence, attending the La Querce Barnabiti Institute and the University of Florence. During the Second World War he was a resistance fighter against German occupation. He was the commander of a partisans Brigade of the VII Divisione Autonoma Monferrato and was decorated with the Italian bronze medal. His academic career took him to a variety of institutions, but he was primarily based at the Sapienza University of Rome from 1966 to 1990.

Biography
Sergio Cotta was born to Alberto Cotta, who was a scholar of forestry sciences, and Mary Nicolis di Robilant, of the aristocratic Robilant family. A direct descendant of the mathematician Leonhard Euler, he studied in Florence at the La Querce Barnabiti Institute and then enrolled at the Faculty of Political Science at the University of Florence where he graduated in 1945.

On 8 September 1943, in Friuli, he was called to arms with the rank of Lieutenant, after the signing of the Italian armistice. With the German army losing, he sailed along the Adriatic to reach unoccupied Italy. After catching malaria, he reached Piedmont, where he was posted to a partisan brigade, the 7th Autonomous Division "Monferrato", as the commander of the 2nd Brigade. He was among the first to enter Turin on the days of liberation. For his participation in the Italian resistance movement, on 24 September 1951, he was awarded the Bronze Medal of Military Valor and 31 March 1952, the War Cross.

In 1945 he married Brozolo Elisabetta Radicati of Brozolo. The couple went on to have three children: Irene, Maurizio, and Gabriella.

Academic career
He started his career at the University of Turin as assistant to Norberto Bobbio. He was promoted to ordinary professor, going on to teach at the University of Perugia, University of Trieste, University of Trento, University of Florence and finally in Rome. He was one of the promoters of the Faculty of Law of the D'Annunzio University in Teramo, where he taught philosophy of law. He held a position at the Sapienza University of Rome from 1966 to 1990, becoming the Chair of philosophy of law and, for some years, was also the director of the homonymous Institute Giorgio Del Vecchio. Retiring in 1995, he became a professor emeritus.

He was a corresponding member of the Turin Academy of Sciences (from 1965) and the 1995 national member of the Accademia dei Lincei. He was a corresponding member of the Institut de France and the Académie des Sciences Morales et Politiques, and a member of the Buenos Aires Academy of Sciences. He was twice president of the Sorbonne International Center of Applied Political Philosophy.

He held the position of President of the Union of Italian Catholic Jurists and of the International Union of Catholic Jurists. He was among the members of the Promoter Committee of the 1974 Referendum of the Divorce Act.

His students included Francesco D'Agostino, Bruno Montanari, Gaetano Carcaterra, Bruno Romano, Domenico Fisichella and the singer Antonello Venditti.

Research
After studying the political thought of the Enlightenment, Cotta's interests focused on the philosophy of law, which he was able to blend with elements of the phenomenological tradition. From the 1950s he published many articles and monographs on the  political vision of Montesquieu, Gaetano Filangieri, St. Thomas Aquinas and St. Augustine, devoting himself to theoretical reflections on law and politics. He was the director of the International Magazine of Philosophy of Law. His works have been translated into French, Greek, English, Portuguese and Spanish.

Honours

 Bronze Medal of Military Valor (October 24, 1951)
 War Merit Cross (March 31, 1952)
 Grand Officer of the Order of Merit of the Republic (December 27, 2003)
 First-class cross of the merits of the science and Culture of the Austrian Republic (14-9-1998)
 Knight of the Grand Cross of the Order of St. Sylvester Pope.

Publications

 Montesquieu and the Science of Society, 1953
 Gaetano Filangieri and the law problem, Torino, Giappichelli, 1954
 The concept of law in the Summa Theologiae of Saint Thomas Aquinas, Turin, Giappichelli, 1955
 The Political City of St. Augustine, 1960
 Philosophy and Politics in Rousseaus Work, 1964
 The technological challenge, 1968
 Ptolemaic man, 1975
 What resistance?, 1977
 The Ptolemaic Man, Ediciones RIALP, Madrid 1977
 Why violence, 1978
 Justification and Obligation of the Standards, 1981
 The Right to Existence. Legal Onphenomenology Lines, 1985
 Why violence? A philosophical interpretation, University of Florida Press, Gainesville, 1985
 From War to Peace, 1989
 Law, Person, Human World, 1989
 The Right to Existence, Extended Edition, 1991
 The political thought of Montesquieu, Bari, Laterza, 1995
 The right to exist, Editions Bière, Bordeaux, 1996
 Human subject, legal entity, 1997
 The Limits of Politics, 2002
 The Right as a Value System, 2004
 Ontology of phenomena juridique, Paris, Dalloz, 2015
 Because Law (new ed.), Brescia, La Scuola, 2017

References

1920 births
2007 deaths
Writers from Florence
Academic staff of the D'Annunzio University of Chieti–Pescara
20th-century Italian philosophers
Academic staff of the Sapienza University of Rome